Micah Masei (born 22 March 1999) is an American Samoan swimmer. He competed in the 2020 Summer Olympics.

Masei was educated at West Salem High School, and later at the University of Hawaiʻi at Mānoa.

In 2019 he represented American Samoa at the FINA World Aquatics Championships in Gwangju, South Korea.

References

External links
 

1999 births
Living people
People from Coos Bay, Oregon
Swimmers at the 2020 Summer Olympics
American Samoan male swimmers
Olympic swimmers of American Samoa
Hawaii Rainbow Warriors swimmers